Seweryn Daniel Gancarczyk (born 22 November 1981) is a Polish former professional footballer who played as a left-back. He most recently served as an assistant coach for Górnik Łęczna.

Career 
Gancarczyk started to play football in his early teens, in junior teams of Podkarpacie Pustynia. After several seasons there and after a short spell at second Polish division club Hetman Zamość, Gancarczyk made his way to the capital of Ukraine, Kyiv, where he joined local Arsenal Kyiv. Having also briefly performed for west Ukrainian club Volyn Lutsk, Gancarczyk was transferred to Metalist Kharkiv, where he has remained since, and has reached a position of vice-captain at the club.

In 2007, he was voted the best left-back in Ukraine.

During the winter of 2008 Gancarczyk had a try-out with Scottish giants Celtic FC, however due to an injury, he was unable to compete and so returned to Metalist.

In January 2018, Gancarczyk joined Rozwój Katowice. He played for the club until the summer 2019, where he joined Podlesianka Katowice.

International
Debuting for his country in 2006 in a 0:1 loss against Lithuania, the defender was named to the 23-men Poland's 2006 World Cup squad for the Cup finals in Germany.

On 14 October 2009, during Poland's last game of the 2010 FIFA World Cup qualifiers against Slovakia, Gancarczyk scored an own goal in the 3rd minute of the game, condemning Poland to a 1–0 defeat and enabling Slovakia to qualify for the World Cup.

Honours
Lech Poznań
Ekstraklasa: 2009–10

Notes

External links 
 
 
 
 

1981 births
Living people
People from Dębica
Sportspeople from Podkarpackie Voivodeship
Polish footballers
Poland international footballers
Polish expatriate footballers
Association football defenders
Hetman Zamość players
FC Arsenal Kyiv players
FC Volyn Lutsk players
FC Metalist Kharkiv players
Lech Poznań players
ŁKS Łódź players
Górnik Zabrze players
GKS Tychy players
Rozwój Katowice players
Ukrainian Premier League players
Ekstraklasa players
I liga players
III liga players
IV liga players
2006 FIFA World Cup players
Expatriate footballers in Ukraine
Polish expatriate sportspeople in Ukraine